The Solheim Cup is a biennial golf tournament for professional women golfers contested by teams representing Europe and the United States. It is named after the Norwegian-American golf club manufacturer Karsten Solheim, who was a driving force behind its creation.

The inaugural Cup was held in 1990, and the event was first staged in even numbered years until 2002, alternating years with the Ryder Cup (the equivalent men's event).  As part of the general reshuffling of team golf events after the one-year postponement of the 2001 Ryder Cup following the September 11 attacks, the Solheim Cup switched to odd numbered years beginning in 2003. Another reshuffle of team golf events took place in 2020 due to the COVID-19 pandemic and the Solheim Cup will return to even numbered years from 2024.

The United States teams have won the cup 10 times, compared with seven for Europe. The current holders are Europe, who won at the Inverness Club in Toledo, Ohio, in 2021.

Format
The tournament is played over three days. Since 2002, there have been 28 matches—eight foursomes and eight four-balls played on days 1 and 2, and 12 singles on the final day. This format is also used in the Ryder Cup. Before 1996, and also in 2000, the Solheim Cup used a similar, but abbreviated format.

One point is awarded to the team that wins each match; in the event of a tie, both teams score half a point. After all matches are complete, the team with more points wins or retains the Cup. Any ties are broken in favor of the defending champion team.

In addition to the indicated number of players, each team includes one captain and a set number of assistant captains (three as of 2015), none of whom play in the matches.

Team qualification and selection
The U.S. team is selected by a points system, with American players on the LPGA Tour receiving points for each top-twenty finish on tour. Through the 2013 event, U.S. citizens born outside the country were ineligible for consideration; beginning in 2015, eligibility for Team USA was expanded to include many more categories of (female) U.S. citizens. For the European team, up to 2005, seven players were selected on a points system based on results on the Ladies European Tour (LET). This allowed top European players who competed mainly on the LPGA Tour to be selected to ensure that the European team was competitive. Since 2007, only the top five players from the LET qualify and another four are selected on the basis of the Women's World Golf Rankings. This reflects the increasing dominance of the LPGA Tour, where almost all top European players spend most of their time. In addition, each team has a number of "captain's picks", players chosen at the discretion of the team captains, regardless of their point standings, though in practice the captain's picks are often the next ranking players.

Captains
Team captains are typically recently retired professional golfers with Solheim Cup playing experience, chosen for their experience playing on previous Cup teams and for their ability to lead a team.

Results

In the 17 competitions through 2021, the United States leads the series 10 to 7.

Future venues
2023: Finca Cortesín Golf Club in Casares near Málaga, Spain; it has previously hosted three Volvo World Match Play Championships.
2024: Robert Trent Jones Golf Club in Gainesville, Virginia; it has previously hosted four Presidents Cup matches.
2026: Bernardus Golf in Cromvoirt, Netherlands; it has previously hosted two editions (2021, 2022) of the Dutch Open.

Records

Most appearances: 12° Laura Davies (Eur), 1990–2011
Most points: 25° Laura Davies (Eur) (22–18–6 record)
Most singles points won: 7° Juli Inkster (USA) (6–1–2 record)
Most foursome points won: 11° Annika Sörenstam (Eur) (11–3–1 record)
Most fourball points won: 11° Cristie Kerr (USA) (11–5–1 record)
Top point percentage (Minimum of 3 Solheim Cup Matches)° Janice Moodie (Eur) (7–2–2)  ° Carin Koch (Eur) (10–3–3) ° Dottie Pepper (USA) (13–5–2) ° Christina Kim (USA) (6–2–2) 
Most points in a single contest: 5° Caroline Hedwall (Eur) 2013
Youngest player: ° Charley Hull (Eur) 2013
Oldest player: ° Juli Inkster (USA) 2011

Sources

See also
Junior Solheim Cup
List of American Solheim Cup golfers
List of European Solheim Cup golfers

Notes

References

External links

 
Team golf tournaments
Women's golf tournaments
Ladies European Tour events
LPGA Tour events
Women's golf tournaments in the United States
Recurring sporting events established in 1990